Jiří Škoda (born 27 March 1956) is a retired Czech cyclist who specialized in road racing. He won a bronze medal in the 100 km time trial at the 1980 Summer Olympics and at the 1981 UCI Road World Championships.

Together with Miloš Hrazdíra, he is the most successful rider of the Tour de Slovaquie, which he won in 1976, 1980 and 1985. He also won the Ytong Bohemia Tour three times (1978, 1983 and 1985) and the Giro delle Regioni twice (1984 and 1985) and Tour of Turkey in 1979.

References

1956 births
Living people
Czech male cyclists
Czechoslovak male cyclists
Sportspeople from Brno
Olympic cyclists of Czechoslovakia
Cyclists at the 1980 Summer Olympics
Olympic medalists in cycling
Olympic bronze medalists for Czechoslovakia
Medalists at the 1980 Summer Olympics
Presidential Cycling Tour of Turkey winners